The minka or Minka Bird is a bird, sometimes described as an owl, that featured in the stories of the Ngarrindjeri people of the Murray River in South Australia. The minka were believed to foretell death.

The mulduwanke is a similar owl or bird of the Ngarrindjeri, but instead of foretelling death it stole children. Both were believed to live in dark recesses.

References

Legendary birds
Australian Aboriginal legendary creatures
Owls in culture